His Excellency (Swedish: Excellensen) is a 1944 Swedish drama film directed by Hasse Ekman and starring Lars Hanson, Gunnar Sjöberg and Elsie Albiin. It was made at the Råsunda Studios in Stockholm. The film's sets were designed by the art director Arne Åkermark. It is based on a 1942 play of the same title by Bertil Malmberg. It was part of a growing number of Swedish films more overtly critical of German war policy, and the only one of them to openly identify the occupiers as Germans and set it in a real country.

Plot
A celebrated Austrian poet strongly opposes Nazism, meanwhile his daughter falls in love with a leading Nazi who becomes commander over the concentration camp where his Excellency later is imprisoned.

Cast 
Lars Hanson as His Excellency Herbert von Blankenau 
Gunnar Sjöberg as Captain Max Karbe 
Elsie Albiin as Elisabeth von Blankenau, his Excellency daughter
Stig Järrel as maj. Monk 
Hugo Björne as father Ignatius 
Tord Stål as Dr. Amann 
Sven Magnusson as Wilhelm 
Hampe Faustman as Warder 
Håkan Westergren as Police Officer 
Carl Ström as Josef
Magnus Kesster as Dr. Blumenreich 
Torsten Hillberg as Colonel 
Sigge Fürst as Kubelik 
Ivar Kåge as Marshal of the Court
Sven Bergvall as President of Poet's Academy

References

Bibliography 
 Iverson, Gunnar, Soderbergh Widding, Astrid & Soila, Tytti. Nordic National Cinemas. Routledge, 2005.
 Qvist, Per Olov & von Bagh, Peter. Guide to the Cinema of Sweden and Finland. Greenwood Publishing Group, 2000.
 Wright, Rochelle. The Visible Wall: Jews and Other Ethnic Outsiders in Swedish Film. SIU Press, 1998.

External links 

1944 films
Films directed by Hasse Ekman
1940s Swedish-language films
Swedish drama films
1944 drama films
Swedish black-and-white films
Swedish films based on plays
Films set in Austria
1940s Swedish films